29th & Welton station was an RTD light rail station in the Five Points neighborhood of Denver, Colorado, United States. Formerly operating as part of the D Line, the station was opened on October 8, 1994, and was operated by the Regional Transportation District.

The station closed on January 6, 2013, as part of RTD's January Service Changes to help with keeping trains running on time and improving bus connections at the 30th & Downing station. The RTD Board of Directors voted in October 2013 to not demolish the station in light of ongoing studies of the Welton Street corridor. The January 14, 2018 service changes introduced the L Line, which now passes through this station in place of the D Line.

References

RTD light rail stations in Denver
Railway stations in the United States opened in 1994
Five Points, Denver
Railway stations closed in 2013